RuffTown Records is a Ghanaian record label  founded in 2015 by Ricky Nana Aygeman (Bullet), a musician and a singer-songwriter  in Ghana. Singer Ebony Reigns was the first artist signed to RuffTown Records, but died in a car accident in 2018. Ebony Reigns first album, under RuffTown was released on December 26, 2017, under the title of Bonyfied. In 2018, the album Bonyfied won the "Album of the Year" at the Vodafone Ghana Music Award.

Artists

Discography

References 

African record labels